Integra-Signum is a Swiss train protection system introduced in 1933. Originally it was called Signum; the name Integra was added later. It transmits data inductively and is simple, robust and reliable also in snow.

How it works
The locomotives have three sending and receiving magnets and there are two trackside magnets near the signals.

Integra-Signum asks the train driver to confirm distant signals that show stop and distant or home signals that show caution. If he does not confirm or passes a home signal that shows stop, the train is stopped automatically. This is achieved by interrupting the power supply to the motors and applying the emergency brake.

The locomotive's sending magnet is a strong permanent magnet, which induces a current in the receiving magnet in the middle of the track, if the signal's short-circuit contact is closed. The receiving magnet on the locomotive consists of two magnet field detectors, which detect the signal's state according to polarity and timing of the magnetic field emitted by the second magnet outside the track:

Stop (home signals): positive - negative, concurrent

Caution (distant signals): negative - positive, concurrent

Caution (home signal): positive - positive, not concurrent

Because Integra-Signum can only stop a train when it's "too late", i.e. after the red signal, it is not sufficient if there is an obstacle less than the braking distance away from the signal, which is especially a problem with fast trains. To address this issue, Zugbeeinflussung ZUB has been introduced.

Despite that Integra-Signum aims to prevent accidents, there was also an accident caused by it. In 1959, an Integra-Signum magnet mounted on a SBB-CFF-FFS RBe 540 EMU tore out a wooden sleeper on a level crossing near Gland, which led to the derailment of the entire train at 125 km/h.

Phasing out 
By 2017 Switzerland had almost completed the migration to ETCS Level 1. Integra-Signum will remain in service for a few years more on a small number of special lines; one of these is the Uetliberg railway line, which will first be converted from DC to AC electrification.

From beginning 2018, new vehicles running on the Swiss network do not need anymore the class B system SIGNUM and ZUB.

See also
 Train protection system
 Integra Signum, the company that developed the system

References

Train protection systems
Rail infrastructure in Switzerland
1933 establishments in Switzerland